Jesús Rubio García-Mina (15 August 1908 – 13 July 1976) was a Spanish politician who served as Minister of National Education of Spain between 1956 and 1962, during the Francoist dictatorship.

References

1908 births
1976 deaths
Education ministers of Spain
Government ministers during the Francoist dictatorship